The Lithuanian Basketball League awards are the 6 annual awards, that are given by the professional Lithuanian Basketball League (LKL), to recognize its teams and players, for their accomplishments.

Team trophies

Individual awards

See also
Basketball in Lithuania

External links 
 Official LKL website
 Official LKL YouTube.com channel
 Lithuanian league at Eurobasket.com

Awards
 
Lietuvos krepšinio lyga lists